Friendship Cemetery is a cemetery located in Columbus, Mississippi.  In 1849, the cemetery was established on 5 acres by the Independent Order of Odd Fellows. The original layout consisted of three interlocking circles, signifying the Odd Fellows emblem.  By 1957, Friendship Cemetery had increased in size to 35 acres, and was acquired by the City of Columbus.  The cemetery was listed on the National Register of Historic Places in 1980 and was designated a Mississippi Landmark in 1989.  As of 2015, the cemetery contained some 22,000 graves within an area of 70 acres and was still in use.

Memorial Day connection
During the American Civil War, Columbus served as a military hospital center for the wounded, particularly after the Battle of Shiloh.  More than 2,000 Confederate soldiers were interred in Friendship Cemetery, along with 40 to 150 Union soldiers.

On April 25, 1866, the graves of these fallen soldiers, both Confederate and Union, were decorated with flowers by a large group of ladies from Columbus.  The women's tribute – treating the soldiers as equals – inspired poet Francis Miles Finch to write the poem, The Blue and the Gray, which was published in an 1867 edition of The Atlantic Monthly.  In 1867, the remains of all Union soldiers were exhumed and reinterred in Corinth National Cemetery.  Over time, these grave decoration days – honoring those who died in military service – eventually morphed into Memorial Day.

Monuments

The cemetery contains two Confederate monuments:

Notable interments
 William Edwin Baldwin (1827–1864), Confederate brigadier general during the American Civil War.
 William Barksdale (1821–1863), Confederate brigadier general during the American Civil War. Cenotaph only, Barksdale's remains were interred in Greenwood Cemetery (Jackson, Mississippi).
 William S. Barry (1821–1868), member of the Provisional Congress of the Confederate States (1861–62).
 William Cocke (1748–1828), U.S. Senator from Tennessee (1796–97, 1799–1805).
 Cornell Franklin (1892–1959), judge who served as chairman of the Shanghai Municipal Council (1937–40).
 Jeptha Vining Harris (1816–1899), Confederate brigadier general during the American Civil War.
 James Thomas Harrison (1811–1879), member of the Provisional Congress of the Confederate States (1861–62).
 Clyde S. Kilby (1902–1986), noted American author and English professor.
 Stephen Dill Lee (1833–1908), Confederate lieutenant general during the American Civil War.
 Joshua Lawrence Meador (1911–1965), Disney animator.
 Jehu Amaziah Orr (1828–1921), member of the Provisional Congress of the Confederate States and the Second Confederate Congress.
 Jacob H. Sharp (1833–1907), Confederate brigadier general during the American Civil War.
 Jesse Speight (1795–1847), U.S. Senator from Mississippi (1845–47).
 Henry Edward Warden (1915–2007), Career officer in the US Air Force; father of the B-52.
 Henry Lewis Whitfield (1868–1927), Governor of Mississippi (1924–27).
 James Whitfield (1791–1875), Governor of Mississippi (1851–52).

References

External links

Columbus, Mississippi
Cemeteries on the National Register of Historic Places in Mississippi
1849 establishments in Mississippi
Mississippi Landmarks
National Register of Historic Places in Lowndes County, Mississippi
Odd Fellows cemeteries in the United States
Cemeteries in Mississippi